Brad Michael Sham (born August 16, 1949) is an American sportscaster who is known as the "Voice of the Dallas Cowboys". Sham is currently the play-by-play announcer on the Dallas Cowboys Radio Network.

Biography
Sham has been with the Cowboys since 1976, when he was hired to be their color analyst alongside play-by-play man Verne Lundquist. Sham also held the position of Sports Director at former Cowboys Radio Network flagship station 1080 AM KRLD between 1976 and 1981. When Lundquist left for CBS in 1984, Sham became the lead play-by-play man, a position he has held ever since (save for three seasons in the mid-1990s). In 2003, Sham wrote Dallas Cowboys: Colorful Tales of America's Greatest Teams. He also contributes weekly columns to dallascowboys.com. The 2009 season marked Sham's 30th year with the organization; the longest of any broadcaster with the team, albeit not consecutive due to his three-year absence from the club from 1995–97. During his absence from the Cowboys, Sham called Texas Rangers games on the radio with Eric Nadel between 1995 and 1997.

Sham has done NFL play-by-play for the NFL on Westwood One, the NFL on Fox, TNT Sunday Night Football, and the NFL on CBS for one game in 2004. He has also worked games for NFL Europe and the Arena Football League's Dallas Desperados. Sham has extensive experience broadcasting collegiate sports, having done play-by-play for NCAA athletics, most notably the NCAA Men's Division I Basketball Championship and college football. He spent over a decade as the radio voice of the Texas Longhorns' football and basketball teams (mostly in the 1980s), which also aired on flagship KRLD and on the Mutual Southwest Radio Network. Sham has been in the booth for 26 Cotton Bowl Classics, calling play-by-play for 25 games and serving as the analyst for one. He has also served as a play-by-play broadcaster for the Big 12 Network basketball Saturdays, as well as for select ESPN Network Big 12 games.

Sham has also worked Major League Soccer games for the Dallas Burn (now FC Dallas) and North American Soccer League games for the Dallas Tornado. He also provided color commentary for ESPN's coverage of the NASL in 1982. He also was part of the crew that covered the 1998 Winter Olympics in Nagano, Japan.

Sham made his acting debut in the 2008 movie, W.

Honors 
Sham has won the NSSA Texas Sportscaster of the Year award 11 times and is a member of the Texas Radio Hall of Fame.

Personal life 
Sham is Jewish. Cory Provus, broadcaster for the Minnesota Twins, is his cousin. He graduated from the University of Missouri School of Journalism in 1970. He was a brother of the Alpha Epsilon Pi fraternity.

References

Arena football announcers
1949 births
Living people
American Basketball Association announcers
American radio sports announcers
American television sports announcers
Association football commentators
College basketball announcers in the United States
College football announcers
Dallas Cowboys announcers
Dallas Mavericks announcers
Jewish American sportspeople
Major League Baseball broadcasters
National Basketball Association broadcasters
National Football League announcers
NFL Europe broadcasters
North American Soccer League (1968–1984) commentators
Sportspeople from Dallas
Texas Rangers (baseball) announcers
Missouri School of Journalism alumni
21st-century American Jews